The 2018 International Tournament of Spain was the 43rd edition of the International Tournament of Spain, 17th edition with the name of Memorial Domingo Barcenas, held in Pontevedra and Vigo, Spain between 5–7 January as a friendly handball tournament organised by the Royal Spanish Handball Federation as a preparation of the host nation to the 2018 European Men's Handball Championship.

Results

Round robin
All times are local (UTC+01:00).

Final standing

References

External links
RFEBM Official Website

International Tournament of Spain
Handball competitions in Spain
2017–18 in Spanish handball